Many towns and localities in Hungary have their own local television station. The majority of these channels are only available on local CATV networks.

List of Hungarian local television channels  
 Ajka TV (Ajka)
 Alba Orion (Székesfehérvár)
 Alföld TV (Debrecen)
 Ácsi TV (Ács)
 Bajai TV (Baja)
 Balmazújváros TV (Balmazújváros)
 Baracs TV (Baracs)
 Bácska TV (Baja)
 Bátonyterenye Városi Televízió (Bátonyterenye)
 Bátor TV (Nyírbátor)
 Bogárdi Tévé (Sárbogárd)
 Bonyhádi Városi TV (Bonyhád)
 Budavidék Regionális Televízió (Budakeszi)
 BTV (Berettyóújfalu)
 Ceglédi Városi Televízió (Cegléd)
 Cell TV (Celldömölk)
 Centrum TV (dél-pesti régió)
 City TV (Budapest - District V. (Belváros-Lipótváros))
 Civil TV (Szentes)
 Csaba TV (Békéscsaba)
 Csepp TV (Budapest - District XXI. (Csepel))
 Csele TV (Mohács)
 Csongrád Televízió (Csongrád)
 Dabas Televízió (Dabas)
 Debrecen TV (Debrecen)
 Dél-pesti kerületi televíziók (Budapest)
 Diák TV (Kazincbarcika)
 KisDuNaTv (Dunaharaszti)
 DSTV (Dunaújváros)
 D+ TV (Dunaújváros)
 Duna Vidék Televízió (Szigetszentmiklós)
 Eger Városi Televízió (Eger)
 Eleven Televízió (Bükkábrány)
 Enying Városi Televízió (Enying)
 ESTV (Pesterzsébet) (Soroksár)
 Érdi Televízió (Érd)
 FMTV (Szigetvár)
 Fonyód TV (Fonyód)
 Fót TV (Fót)
 Főnix - A Fő Városi Televízió (Budapest)
 Főnix TV (Tiszafüred)
 Füred TV (Balatonfüred)
 Füzes TV (Füzesgyarmat)
 Füzesabonyi Városi Televízió (Füzesabony)
 Galga TV (Aszód)
 Gerje TV (Albertirsa)
 Gotthárd TV (Szentgotthárd)
 Gödöllő Plusz TV (Gödöllő)
 Gyömrői Városi Televízió (Gyömrő)
 Gyöngyösi Városi Televízió (Gyöngyös)
 Gyula Televízió (Gyula)
 Hajdúnánási Helyi Televízió (Hajdúnánás)
 Hajdúszoboszlói Városi Televízió (Hajdúszoboszló)
 Halas TV (Kiskunhalas)
 Halom TV (Százhalombatta)
 Hatvan TV (Hatvan)
 HBTV (Hajdúböszörmény)
 Híd Televízió (Komárom)
 Híd TV Barcs (Barcs)
 Hódmezővásárhelyi Televízió (Hódmezővásárhely)
 Inside TV (Göd)
 Ipoly TV (Balassagyarmat)
 Jánossomorja TV (Jánossomorja)
 Jász Trió TV (Jászberény)
 Kaba Városi TV (Kaba)
 Kalocsa TV (Kalocsa)
 Kanizsa TV (Nagykanizsa)
 Kapos Televízió (Kaposvár)
 Karcag Televízió (Karcag)
 Kecel Városi TV (Kecel)
 Kecskeméti Televízió (Kecskemét)
 Kerecsen TV (Debrecen)
 Kerületi TV (Budapest - District IX.(Ferencváros))
 Keszthely TV (Keszthely)
 KisKőrös TV (Kiskőrös)
 Kölcsey TV (Nyíregyháza)
 Kör TV (Ráckeve)
 Körmendi Városi Televízió (Körmend)
 Körös TV (Szarvas)
 Körzeti Televízió (Esztergom)
 Ladány TV (Püspökladány)
 M1 TV (Mátészalka)
 Makó Városi Televízió (Makó)
 Marcali Városi TV (Marcali)
 Másik TV (Dombóvár)
 Miskolc TV (Miskolc)
 Mosonmagyaróvári Városi Televízió (Mosonmagyaróvár)
 Mozaik TV (Ercsi)
 Móri Városi TV (Mór)
 Nagyatádi Városi Televízió (Nagyatád)
 Nagykállói Televízió (Nagykálló)
 Nyerges TV (Nyergesújflu)
 Nyéki TV (Nyékládháza)
 Nyíregyházi Televízió (Nyíregyháza)
 Objektív Telvízió (Gyergyószentmiklós)
 Orosházi Városi Televízió (Orosháza)
 Oroszlányi Televízió (Oroszlány)
 Ózdi Városi Televízió (Ózd)
 Öböl TV (Balatonfűzfő)
 Pásztói Városi TV (Pásztó)
 Pátria TV (Vecsés)
 Pécs TV (Pécs)
 Pilis TV (Solymár)
 Polgárdi VTV (Polgárdi)
 Pomáz TV (Pomáz)
 Pont TV (Isaszeg)
 Promontor TV (Budapest - District XXII.(Budafok-Tétény))
 Pulzus TV (Sopron)
 Putnok Városi Televízió (Putnok)
 Rábaközi Televízió (Kapuvár)
 Revita Televízió (Győr)
 Régió Televízió Esztergom (Esztergom)
 Sajó TV (Sajószentpéter)
 Salgótarjáni Városi Televízió (Salgótarján)
 Sarkad TV (Sarkad)
 Sió Televízió (Siófok)
 Somogy Televízió (Kaposvár)
 SopronTV (Sopron)
 Strázsahegyi Közösségi Televízió (Esztergom)
 Supra TV (Balatonboglár)
 Szegedi Városi Televízió (Szeged)
 Szerencsi Televízió (Szerencs)
 Fehérvár TV (Székesfehérvár)
 Szilas TV (Kerepes)
 Szolnok TV (Szolnok)
 Szombathelyi Televízió (Szombathely)
 T1TV (Törökszentmiklós)
 Tapolca TV (Tapolca)
 Tatabánya TV (Tatabánya)
 Tatai TV (Tata)
 Telekeszi TV (Dunakeszi)
 TelePaks (Paks)
 Telin TV (Szeged)
 Tiszafüred Városi Televízió (Tiszafüred)
 TiszapART Kulturális Televízió (Szeged)
 Tisza TV (Tiszaújváros)
 Tiszavasvári Városi Televízió (Tiszavasvári)
 Tolnatáj Televízió (Szekszárd)
 Tó Tévé (Gárdony)
 Trió TV (Kiskunfélegyháza)
 Túri Televízió (Mezőtúr)
 TV Kisúj (Kisújszállás)
 TV Szentendre (Szentendre)
 TV10 (Budapest - District X.(Kőbánya))
 Vadna Községi Televízió (Vadna)
 VÁC-ES Televízió (Vác)
 Várpalota TV (Várpalota)
 Veresegyházi Városi TV (Veresegyház)
 Veszprém Televízió (Veszprém)
 VTV Nyíregyháza (Nyíregyháza)
 VTV Pápa (Pápa)
 Williams Televízió (Vecsés)
 Zalaegerszegi Televízió (Zalaegerszeg)
 Zamárdi VTV (Zamárdi)
 Zemplén TV (Sátoraljaújhely)
 Zenit TV (Budapest - District XVI.)
 Zugló TV (Budapest - District XIV.(Zugló))
 Zsolca TV (Felsőzsolca)

See also
 Media of Hungary

Hungary
Channels